"En haluu kuolla tänä yönä" is a Finnish-language song by Finnish pop singer Jenni Vartiainen. It was released on 1 February 2010 by Warner Music Finland as the lead single from her second studio album Seili. The lyrics are written by Finnish rapper Mariska and composed by Vartiainen and Jukka Immonen. "En haluu kuolla tänä yönä" received the 2010 Emma Award for the Song of the Year and it was the most-played song on commercial Finnish radio stations in 2010 with over 5,200 plays.

Chart performance
In February 2010, "En haluu kuolla tänä yönä" debuted at number 11 on the Finnish Singles Chart and jumped to number one the next week. The song charted for a total of 21 weeks. Selling platinum with over 11,000 copies in Finland to date, "En haluu kuolla tänä yönä" was the sixth-best-selling single of 2010.

Track listing

Charts and certifications

Weekly charts

Year-end charts

|-

|-

|-

Certifications

See also
List of number-one singles of 2010 (Finland)

References

External links
 Official music video of "En haluu kuolla tänä yönä" at Myspace.com

2010 singles
Jenni Vartiainen songs
Finnish-language songs
Songs written by Jukka Immonen
Number-one singles in Finland
Warner Music Finland singles
2010 songs